Jeff Dee is an American artist and game designer. He was the youngest artist in the history of pioneering role-playing game company TSR when he began his work at the age of eighteen. He also designed the Villains and Vigilantes superhero game. He was a co-host on The Atheist Experience and Non-Prophets atheism advocacy podcasts.

Biography
In the late 1970s, while Dee was still a teenager, he and Jack Herman created Villains and Vigilantes, the first complete superhero role-playing game. The game was published by Fantasy Games Unlimited in 1979. Dee and Herman persuaded Scott Bizar to produce a second edition, which was published in 1982. Dee came up with the idea of creating a role-playing game based on cartoons when he, Greg Costikyan, and other designers were discussing which genres had no role-playing game systems yet; although they agreed that it would be impossible for such a game to be designed, a few years later Costikyan designed Toon as a full game with the assistance of Warren Spector.

Dee was the youngest artist in TSR history when he began working for them at the age of eighteen. In 1997, with his partner 'Manda, Dee founded UNIgames, a publisher of role-playing, board and computer games. Dee designed a new superhero role-playing game originally titled Advanced Villains and Vigilantes, which was ultimately published as Living Legends in 2005. In 2009, he co-founded Nemesis Games, developers of an MMO named Gargantua.

Advocacy of atheism
In addition to his artistic and game-related work, Dee is an outspoken atheist and transhumanist. He has been the host of a bi-weekly Internet podcast called The Non-Prophets and a former host of a live, weekly, public-access television program, The Atheist Experience.

References

External links
 

 A Jeff Dee art gallery, including most of his AD&D work
 What Worries Jeff Dee?, Dee's blog

American atheism activists
American speculative fiction artists
American transhumanists
Atheist Community of Austin people
Fantasy artists
Game artists
Living people
Role-playing game artists
Role-playing game designers
Year of birth missing (living people)